When I Was a Kid (1971) is the 12th comedy album by Bill Cosby, recorded at the Westbury Music Fair (later renamed Theatre at Westbury).  The cover is an early appearance of Fat Albert and the Cosby Kids.

Track listing
My Hernia  – 6:22
Buck Jones  – 6:18
Snakes and Alligators  – 2:38
My Boy Scout Troupe  – 2:13
My Brother, Russell  – 3:31
My Father  – 3:21
Dogs  – 3:35
Frogs  – 2:50

References

1971 albums
Bill Cosby live albums
Stand-up comedy albums
Spoken word albums by American artists
Live spoken word albums
MCA Records live albums
1970s comedy albums